Volcanic Ridge is an 11,486-foot-elevation (3,501 meter) ridge located in the Sierra Nevada mountain range in Madera County of northern California, United States. It is situated in the Ansel Adams Wilderness on land managed by Inyo National Forest. The Minarets are one mile to the west and Devils Postpile National Monument is five miles to the southeast.

History
The descriptive toponym was likely applied during an 1898–99 survey by the USGS, and has been officially adopted by the U.S. Board on Geographic Names.

The first ascent of the summit was recorded August 13, 1933, by Craig Barbash and Howard Gates.

The Minaret Mine was located on the south aspect of the ridge. Lead was mined there, but the remote location made mining unprofitable, and the mine ceased operations in the early 1930s.

Volcanic Ridge is the site of the fatal 2007 airplane crash of Steve Fossett.

Climate
According to the Köppen climate classification system, Volcanic Ridge is located in an alpine climate zone. Most weather fronts originate in the Pacific Ocean, and travel east toward the Sierra Nevada mountains. As fronts approach, they are forced upward by the peaks (orographic lift), causing them to drop their moisture in the form of rain or snowfall onto the range. Precipitation runoff from this landform drains to the Middle Fork San Joaquin River.

See also
 
 Sierra Nevada

Gallery

References

External links
 Weather forecast: Volcanic Ridge

Mountains of Madera County, California
Mountains of the Ansel Adams Wilderness
North American 3000 m summits
Mountains of Northern California
Sierra Nevada (United States)
Inyo National Forest